The Blade Spares None is a 1971 Hong Kong action film with sword fighting directed by Teddy Yip Wing Cho.

Plot

Ho Li-Chun, an attractive but powerful swordswoman, fights at a tournament at Prince Kuei's Palace. A knight, Chen Jo-Yu, is defeated but later returns with another knight, Tang Ching-Yun, who is in possession of a peculiar sword. Ho recognizes this as the weapon once used by Sun Tien-Chen, an enemy of her family. Investigating the case, she learns that Prince Kuei was actually murdered, and it is Sun who has assumed his identity as an imposter. Ho, in coordination with Chen and Tang, plan to confront him and eventually attack the palace.

Cast
Nora Miao as Ho Li-Chun (as Ker Hsiu Miao)
Patrick Tse as Tang Ching Yun (as Hsien Hsieh)
James Tien as Chen Jo Yu (as Chun Tien)  
Paul Chang Chung as Prince Kuei (Guest star) (as Chung Chang)
Feng Yi as Chuang Shih Piao 
Chiang Nan as Kao Wan
Ng Ming Tsui
Lee Wan Chung
Kwan Shan
Eddie Ko Hung
Sammo Hung
Lam Ching Ying as Prince's Fighter 
Wilson Tong
Jackie Chan as Young Ching Yun (uncredited)

External links
 The Blade Spares None at HKcinemamagic.com
 

1971 films
Golden Harvest films
1970s fantasy action films
Hong Kong action films
1970s Mandarin-language films
Chinese action films
1970s Hong Kong films